Ethadophis foresti is an eel in the family Ophichthidae (worm/snake eels). It was described by Jean Cadenat and Charles Roux in 1964. It is a marine, deep water-dwelling eel which is endemic to Cape Verde, in the eastern Atlantic Ocean. It dwells at a depth range of 25–30 metres, and inhabits the continental shelf, where it forms burrows in mud or sand. Males can reach a maximum total length of 32.1 centimetres.

References

Ophichthidae
Fish of the Atlantic Ocean
Fish described in 1964
Taxa named by Jean Cadenat